Face Down (French title: Tête baissée) is a 2015 drama film directed by Kamen Kalev and starring  Melvil Poupaud and Seher Nebieva. It received the Best Director Award at the Golden Rose Film Festival.

Cast 
 Melvil Poupaud as Samy
 Seher Nebieva as Elka
 Lidia Koleva as Snejana
 Sunai Siuleiman as Uhoto
 Aylin Yay as Yanne
 Atanas Asenov as Canko
 Youssef Hajdi as Driss
 Hocine Choutri as Kader
 Johan Carlsson as Brian
 Nadejda Ilieva as Lidiya

References

External links 
 

2015 films
2015 drama films
2010s French-language films
2010s Bulgarian-language films
French multilingual films
Bulgarian multilingual films
French drama films
Belgian drama films
Bulgarian drama films
Drama films based on actual events
Films directed by Kamen Kalev
2010s French films